Marguerite de Carrouges (née de Thibouville; 1362, Château de Fontaine-la-Soret (Eure) – c. 1419) was a French noblewoman.
She married Jean de Carrouges in 1380.

Family and marriage
She was the only daughter of Jeanne de Bois Héroult and the highly controversial Robert de Thibouville, a Norman lord who had twice sided against the French king in territorial conflicts. By the union of Marguerite and Carrouges, de Thibouville hoped to restore his family's status while Carrouges was hoping for an heir from the young Marguerite, whom contemporaries described as "young, noble, wealthy, and also very beautiful".

Lawsuit and duel

Shortly after his marriage, Carrouges revealed another motive for the union. The valuable estate of Aunou-le-Faucon, given to his rival Jacques Le Gris two years earlier, had been formerly owned by Carrouges' father-in-law, Robert de Thibouville, and had been bought by Count Pierre II of Alençon for 8,000 French livres in 1377. Carrouges immediately began a lawsuit to recover the land-based on an assumed prior claim to it. The case dragged on for some months until ultimately Count Pierre was forced to visit his cousin King Charles VI to officially confirm his ownership of the land and his right to give it to whomever of the followers he chose. The lawsuit reflected very poorly on Carrouges at the court in Argentan and resulted in his further estrangement from Count Pierre's circle.

Marguerite de Carrouges accused Jacques Le Gris of rape, leading to one of the last judicial duels permitted by the French king and the Parliament of Paris (the actual last duel occurred in 1547 opposing Guy Chabot de Jarnac against François de Vivonne). The combat was decreed on December 29, 1386 in Paris.

In popular culture
The story of the duel inspired Ridley Scott's 2021 film The Last Duel based on the 2004 book The Last Duel: A True Story of Trial by Combat in Medieval France by Eric Jager in which she was played by Jodie Comer.

References 

1362 births
1419 deaths
14th-century French women